The Men's Freestyle 65 kg is a competition featured at the 2021 European Wrestling Championships, and was held in Warsaw, Poland on April 19 and April 20.

Medalists

Results 
 Legend
 F — Won by fall
WO — Won by walkover

Main Bracket

Repechage

References

External links

Men's freestyle 65 kg